Marty Garner (born May 2, 1967) is an American professional wrestler most noted for his appearances for World Wrestling Entertainment and his time in Extreme Championship Wrestling.

Professional wrestling career

Early career (1993–1995)
Garner started wrestling in several independent wrestling promotions based in North Carolina, mainly wrestling under the ring name Cham Pain in Southern Championship Wrestling, New Dimension Wrestling and OMEGA.

World Wrestling Federation (1995–1997)
Garner has made numerous appearances for WWE/F as an enhancement talent, beginning in December 1995 against Jeff Jarrett. He then made several appearances in 1996 and 1997 against wrestlers such as Hunter Hearst Helmsley, Jerry Lawler, Jim Neidhart, Yoshihiro Tajiri, and Marc Mero.

Pedigree incident (1996)
On May 28, 1996, Garner faced Hunter Hearst Helmsley (Triple H) during the taping of WWF Superstars. During the match, Helmsley went for his finisher, the Pedigree. It is reported that Garner, who had not taken the move before and assumed it was either a double underhook powerbomb or suplex, gave much more jump into the move and attempted to flip out of it while Helmsley went through the move as usual. This resulted in a very violent version of the move in which Garner landed directly on top of his head and suffered neck damage. This incident was captured on video and circulated throughout the Internet. Despite the move being botched it was still broadcast on Superstars show, and even featured as the WWF's Slam of the Week.

Following this, Garner appeared on several daytime talk shows including Sally Jessy Raphael, Jenny Jones and, most notably, on Montel Williams in an episode about former "geeks" reuniting with past tormentors. Discussing the incident on the show, a clip of Garner's match against Helmsley, including the botched Pedigree, was also shown.

Extreme Championship Wrestling (1999–2000) 

Garner began appearing in ECW in 1999 as the Ragin' Cajun, managing Rod Price.  He soon changed his name to Puck Dupp, a member of the Dupp Family, in a hillbilly gimmick.

Return to WWE (2006–2008)
Garner appeared in the now renamed WWE again for two appearances in 2006, wrestling in a tag team match against  Kid Kash and Jamie Noble on SmackDown! and then facing the debuting Montel Vontavious Porter at the No Mercy pay-per-view. He appeared at a Raw house show on November 26, 2007 against Vladmir Kozlov and faced Kozlov again on the April 25, 2008 airing of SmackDown!.

Championships and accomplishments
Memphis Championship Wrestling
MCW Southern Tag Team Championship (2 times) - with Bo Dupp and Jack Dupp

National Championship Wrestling
NCW Television Championship (1 time)

Organization of Modern Extreme Grappling Arts
OMEGA Heavyweight Championship (1 time)
OMEGA New Frontiers Championship (1 time)

Pro Wrestling Illustrated
PWI ranked him # 269 of the 500 best singles wrestlers of the PWI 500 in 2001

Southern Championship Wrestling
SCW Heavyweight Championship (3 times)

Filmography
Walking Tall (assistant: The Rock)

References

External links
OmegaPowers Original Profile
 

American male professional wrestlers
Living people
1967 births